MJR Digital Cinemas (formerly MJR Theatres) is a movie theater chain with 10 theaters in the Metro Detroit area, the company is a subsidiary of the Belgium  Kinepolis Group.

History
MJR Theatres was created in 1970 by Mike Mihalich with the acquisition of Main Theatre (sold in 1997 and now known as the Main Art Theatre) in Royal Oak, Michigan. The name MJR was taken from their original slogan Movies Just Right. During the 1980s and 1990s the company purchased several theaters and drive-ins in Michigan. Following their acquisitions the company started building their own multiplex cinemas, with the first opening in Adrian, Michigan in 1990. In order to finance the new cinemas, MJR sold some of its existing theaters and drive-ins. 

During the 1990s Luna Enterprises purchased an interest in the chain.

In 2014, MJR created its own PLF (Premium Large Format) named The EPIC Experience by combining Dolby Atmos and a 4K projector from Christie.

In 2019 the chain was acquired for $152.25 million by the Belgium-based Kinepolis Group, a cinema chain with theaters in Europe and North America. With the acquisition the group entered the US market.

References

External links
Official Website
Kinepolis corporate website

Movie theatre chains in the United States
Companies based in Oakland County, Michigan
1980 establishments in Michigan